Jaan Saul may refer to:
 Jaan Saul (politician) (1866–1954), Estonian politician 
 Jaan Saul (actor) (1936–1966), Estonian actor